Never the Twain Shall Meet is a 1925 American silent South Seas drama film based on the book by Peter B. Kyne, produced by MGM and directed by Maurice Tourneur, starring Anita Stewart and featuring Boris Karloff in an uncredited bit part. It was remade as talking picture in 1931 at MGM by director W. S. Van Dyke. This is one of Tourneur's many lost and sought after films.

Plot
As described in a film magazine review, Tamea, whose mother was Polynesian and her father French, leaves the island where her father governs and goes with him on a trade trip to San Francisco. When they arrive in port, the health officers find that the father is a leper, and he jumps into the water and is drowned. Tamea is taken to the home of Dan Pritchard, the junior partner of the firm that her father traded through. With his friend Mark Mellenger, Dan tries to show the visiter a good time around town. Although Dan is engaged to Maisie Morrison, a young society woman, his affections are drawn to Tamea. When she hastily leaves for home, Dan follows her. She falls violently in love with him and they are married according to the native custom of the island. The South Seas gets into his blood and Dan falls into moral dissolution. Mark arrives on the island to visit him with Maisie in tow. Dan returns to San Francisco and marries Maisie while Mark on the island to comfort Tamea.

Cast

See also
 Boris Karloff filmography

References

External links

Southseascinema.org

1925 films
1925 drama films
1925 lost films
Silent American drama films
American silent feature films
American black-and-white films
Films directed by Maurice Tourneur
Films set in Oceania
Lost American films
Lost drama films
Metro-Goldwyn-Mayer films
1920s American films